The Nem-Catacoa Festival was a music festival held in 2010 in Cajicá, Colombia, a town just north of the capital Bogotá. It was named after the mythical Nencatacoa. Plans were made for a second edition of the festival in 2011, but this never materialised, and with the rise in popularity of the Estéreo Picnic Festival, which began in the same year and has a similar music policy, it seems unlikely that the Nem-Catacoa Festival will ever return.

History
The festival was held on 9 and 10 October 2010 in the Polo Club, Cajicá. Green Day, Jamiroquai and Cobra Starship were the headliners.

Saturday 9 October

Zipa Stage (main stage):
Jamiroquai
Cobra Starship
Superlitio
Retrovisor

Zaque Stage (second stage):
Tego Calderón
Mala Rodríguez
La Republica
Naki
La Mojarra Electrica

Maloka Stage (electronic tent):
Young Empires
Grafton Primary
Radio Rebelde
Troyans
LSCFJ
Makintouch

Sunday 10 October

Zipa Stage (main stage):
Green Day
Don Tetto

Zaque Stage (second stage):
The Bravery
El Cuarteto de Nos
Profetas
V for Volume
The Mills

Maloka Stage (electronic tent):
De Juepuchas
3 de Corazon
The Hall Effect
MET
Diva Gash (not on original programme)
Remaj7
Galeano
Camo

See also

 List of music festivals in Colombia

References 

Rock festivals in Colombia
Music festivals established in 2010
Defunct music festivals